"When You've Got to Go" is the second episode of the eighth series of the British comedy series Dad's Army. It was first transmitted on Friday 12 September 1975.

Plot
Wilson and Mrs Pike are having tea waiting for Frank to come home from his call-up medical. When Frank arrives home, his mother is unpleasantly surprised when he tells her that he has passed A1 (in spite of his chronically bad chest, his painful sinuses, his weak ankles and recently acquired nervous twitch), and has requested to be put in the RAF. At the evening's parade, Mainwaring and the platoon are deciding what to do to celebrate Private Pike's departure. They decide to have a dinner at the Fish and Chip restaurant.

Later on, Mainwaring is having a meeting with representatives of the blood donor service who ask him how many pints of blood he and the platoon will be able to donate. He originally says 50, but after learning that the Wardens have also promised 50, he then changes his mind and says 100. Mainwaring soon discovers he has bitten off more than he can chew, as all but two members of the platoon (Mainwaring himself and Pike) are ineligible to donate blood due to medical conditions or being overage. Hodges arrives to rub it in to Mainwaring, but is interrupted by Corporal Jones, who states that he has been down to the POW camp and gathered 80 Italian soldiers. Hodges then states that he still wins because he reached his target. Jones then replies that he has not, as he has also brought down 17 nuns as well. With Mainwaring, Pike and the Vicar making donations as well, it brings the total for the platoon to 100 pints. Meanwhile, one of the doctors has discovered that Private Pike's blood type is so rare that you will not find another one like him in 10,000.

Later, the platoon are sitting in the restaurant having the fish and chip dinner in honour of Pike. After Wilson says a few words, Pike says that he would like to tell them all a funny story. He mentions the results of the blood drive and how rare his blood type is, and that if he was wounded in the Air Force, they would not be able to provide him with a blood transfusion. Frazer remarks that "so far the story hasn't been highly comic". Then, Pike adds that because of his rare blood type, the RAF will not have him and so he is not leaving, and the reason he didn't want to tell the platoon straight away is because he had never had a dinner in his honour before. Mainwaring responds with "You stupid boy!"

Cast
Arthur Lowe as Captain Mainwaring
John Le Mesurier as Sergeant Wilson
Clive Dunn as Lance Corporal Jones
John Laurie as Private Frazer
Arnold Ridley as Private Godfrey
Ian Lavender as Private Pike
Janet Davies as Mrs Pike
Bill Pertwee as ARP Warden Hodges
Frank Williams as The Vicar
Edward Sinclair as The Verger
Eric Longworth as Town Clerk
Freddie Earlle as Italian Sergeant
Tim Barrett as Doctor
Colin Bean as Private Sponge
Frankie Holmes as Fishfryer

Dad's Army (series 8) episodes
1975 British television episodes